Mirchi FM  is a Fiji Hindi language radio station in Fiji. The station broadcasts on the 97.8 frequency to the cities of Suva, Navua, Nausori, Labasa, Savusavu, Nadi, Denarau, Mamanuca and Lautoka. The station also broadcasts on the 97.6 MHz frequency to the towns of Coral Coast and Ba. The station broadcasts on 98.0 megahertz to the town of Tavua, and on 98.2 megahertz to Rakiraki and Nabouwalu. Mirchi FM is Fiji's first Hindi FM radio.

It is operated by Fiji Broadcasting Corporation, the company which also owns FBC TV, Radio Fiji One, Radio Fiji Two, Bula FM, 2day FM-Fiji, and Gold FM-Fiji in Fiji.

Mirchi FM was launched as Radio Rajdhani on 1 July 1989, and was rebranded as Bula 98 FM in 1998. To compete with other radio stations and attract more audience, the station once again changed its name to Radio Mirchi in 2004. To give better business outlook, the station was rebranded as Mirchi FM on 1 August 2009. The main competitors of Mirchi FM are Communications Fiji Limited owned Radio Navtarang and Radio Sargam.

Mirchi FM is airing entertainment shows like Mast Morning, Saheli, Raftaar, Bhabi Ji Ghar Par Hai, Sham-e-Guzarish, Saturday Night Fever, Mohabbato Ka Safar and Saturday Sports. Mirchi FM is essentially a music station featuring a range of popular Hindi songs from the 1990s to present era. Its target audience are young people from the age of 12 to 20 years.

Program line-up
Mirchi FM’s lineup is as follows 
 Mast Morning 5.45am - 10.00am: Ziyad Khan, Ashna Shabir
 Saheli 10 am - 12 pm: Aziza
 Lunch Box 12pm - 3 pm: Shruti Chaudhry
 Raftaar 3 pm - 6 pm: Ashneel Singh
 Sham-e-guzarish 6pm - 7 pm: Ashna Shabir
 Mirchi Nights 7 pm - 12am: Farhan Khan
 Jaagte Raho 12am - 5 am: Renisha

Renuka Goundar (former daytime announcer of Radio Navtarang) is the station’s current Programs Director, while Shammi Lochan Lal is the station Manager.

Former Radio Jockeys
Some of the famous radio jockey that have worked with Mirchi FM;
 Shammi Lochan Lal
 Jitendra Shyam
 Dharmendra Shyam
 Sashi Kanta
 Kaajal
 Rita Jeet
 Sangeeta Sharma
 Vijay Verma
 Sharit Singh
 Ranjana Kumar
 Angeleen Sharma
 Prem Chand
 Pranil Chand
 Jasmine Khan
 Deo Raj Raju
 Sandhaya Narayan
 Veena Kumar Bhatnagar
 Roneel Narayan
 Jeff Khan
 Ashok Lingam
 Pawan Rekha
 Sherin Prasad
 Rohit Ritesh Sharma
 Ashmita Sen
 Angie Raj
 Sharila Lazarus
 Saleshni Sen
 Neha Kumar/Shabana Azmi
 Lawerence Singh (Pisto)

Old Logo

References 

Hindi-language radio stations
Radio stations in Fiji
Hindi Radio in Fiji